Chane may refer to:

 Chané, an indigenous people of South America
 Chané language, an extinct Amerindian
 Chañe, a municipality in Spain
 Chane, Bhiwandi, a village in Bhiwandi taluka, India
 Chane (mayfly), a genus of insects
 Chane Behanan, American basketball player
 John Bryson Chane, American bishop

See also 
 
 Chanes (disambiguation)
 Chain (disambiguation)

Language and nationality disambiguation pages